The VCU Rams women's volleyball program represents Virginia Commonwealth University in NCAA Division I women's volleyball.

See also
List of NCAA Division I women's volleyball programs

References

External links